This article is about the particular significance of the decade 1840–1849 to Wales and its people.

Incumbents
Prince of Wales — Albert Edward (from 1841)
Princess of Wales — vacant

Events
1840
1841
1842
1843
1844
1845
1846
1847
1848
1849

Arts and literature

New books
Anne Beale — Traits and Stories of the Welsh Peasantry (1849)
Robert Elis (Cynddelw) — Yr Adgyfodiad (1849)
John Hughes — The Self-Searcher (1848)
John Jenkins — National Education (1848)
Samuel Lewis — Topographical Dictionary of Wales (1849)
John Lloyd
Poems (1847)
The English Country Gentleman (1849)
Richard Williams Morgan — Maynooth and St. Asaph (1848)
Edward Parry — Railway Companion from Chester to Holyhead (1848)
Thomas Stephens — The Literature of the Kymry (1849)
Morris Williams (Nicander)
Y Flwyddyn Eglwysig (1843)
Llyfr yr Homiliau (1847)

Music
Rosser Beynon — Telyn Seion (1845)
John Ambrose Lloyd — Y Ganaan Glyd (1845)
Rowland Prichard — Cyfaill y Cantorion (The Singer's Friend) (1844)
Robert Herbert Williams — Alawydd Trefriw (1848)

Births
1840
September 16 — Alfred Thomas, 1st Baron Pontypridd (died 1927)
November 29 — Rhoda Broughton, novelist (died 1920)
December 3 — Francis Kilvert, diarist (died 1879)
December 5 — John E. Jones, governor of Nevada (died 1896)
December 17 — Matthew Vaughan-Davies, 1st Baron Ystwyth, politician (died 1935)
date unknown — John Rhŷs, educationist (died 1915)
1841
January 28 — Sir Henry Morton Stanley, explorer (died 1904)
May 21 — Joseph Parry, composer (died 1903)
November 9 — Edward Albert, Prince of Wales (later Edward VII; died 1910)
1842
June 14 — William Abraham (Mabon), politician (died 1922)
September 28 — William John Parry, quarrymen's leader (died 1927)
1843
May 12 — Thomas William Rhys Davids, founder of the Pali Text Society (died 1922)
December 20 — Frances Hoggan, first British woman to qualify as a doctor (died 1927)
1844
April 28 — Thomas Jones (Tudno), poet (died 1895)
July 28 — Gerard Manley Hopkins, Welsh-descended poet (died 1889)
December 1 — Alexandra of Denmark, Princess of Wales 1901–1910
1845
June 21 — Samuel Griffith, Premier of Queensland (died 1920)
October 10 — Timothy Richard, missionary
date unknown — Alfred Lewis Jones, shipping magnate (died 1909)
1847
date unknown
Daniel James, hymn-writer (died 1920)
Llewelyn Kenrick, footballer (died 1933)
1848
September 18 — Robert Harris, painter (died 1919)
December 30 — David Jenkins, composer (died 1915)
1849

Deaths
1841
June 8 — John Elias, preacher (born 1774)
date unknown — John Blackwell (Alun), poet (born 1797)
1842
August 20 — Hussey Vivian, 1st Baron Vivian, relation of the Vivian family of Swansea (born 1775)
1843
March 26 — Robert Richford Roberts, Welsh-descended Methodist leader in the USA
March 27 — Henry Nevill, 2nd Earl of Abergavenny (born 1755)
1845
January 1 — Sir William Nott, military leader (born 1782)
1848
March 18 — John Crichton-Stuart, 2nd Marquess of Bute, creator of modern Cardiff (born 1793)
date unknown — Thomas Price (Carnhuanawc), poet and historian (born 1787)
1849
March 21 — William Sherley Williams, Welsh-descended pioneer
September 16 — Thomas Jones, missionary

 
19th century in Wales
Wales